The Mayor of Bucharest, sometimes known as the General Mayor, is the head of the Bucharest City Hall in Bucharest, Romania, which is responsible for citywide affairs, such as the water system, the transport system and the main boulevards. The title of  General Mayor is sometimes used to distinguish the office from that of the mayors that lead each of Bucharest's six administrative sectors, and which are responsible for local area affairs, such as secondary streets, parks, schools and cleaning services. All decisions of the mayor have to be approved by the 55-seat General Council of Bucharest.

The office was created on 7 August 1864, when a new French-style local administration law was adopted.

The two before last elections saw Sorin Oprescu elected as Mayor of Bucharest, for the first time in June 2008 and afterwards for a second term in June 2012. On 6 September 2015, Sorin Oprescu was detained on suspicion of corruption and bribery charges.

On 15 September 2015, he was replaced by a general council elected deputy-mayor for the remainder of his term which ended the following year.

On 5 June 2016, Gabriela Firea was elected Mayor with 246,553 votes (42.97%) and she was sworn in on 23 June.

On 27 September 2020, Nicușor Dan was elected Mayor and he was sworn in on 29 October.

See also
 List of mayors of Bucharest

References